William Shawn Walsh (June 21, 1955 – September 26, 2001) was the head ice hockey coach for the University of Maine Black Bears.

Career
Walsh was a third-string goalie for Bowling Green State University. As a sophomore, he decided to concentrate on coaching as a volunteer assistant for the BGSU hockey team. He was graduated from Bowling Green with a bachelor's degree in education. He later earned a master's degree in the same field of study.

After completing his undergraduate studies, Walsh was hired as a full-time assistant coach at BGSU by Ron Mason. Walsh followed Mason to Michigan State in 1979 where they inherited a program that had only won 36 games in its previous three seasons. After only five years, Mason and Walsh had guided MSU to three-straight NCAA Tournament appearances, back-to-back 30-win seasons and the 1984 Frozen Four—the school's first Frozen Four appearance in 17 years.

In 1984 Walsh took over a Maine program that had gone 27–65 in the three seasons prior. He built the program into a national power. In his third year, he led Maine to its first-ever NCAA Tournament, followed by consecutive Frozen Fours in 1988 and 1989. In 1992–93, he led Maine to an astonishing 42–1–2 record and their first NCAA title. Maine was also national finalists in 1995. He coached Hobey Baker Award winners Scott Pellerin (1992) and Paul Kariya (1993).

Walsh was suspended from coaching for one year starting mid-season in 1995–96 after a series of NCAA investigations. He returned during the 1996–97 season and quickly built Maine back into a national contender, winning another national championship in 1999.

Walsh was diagnosed with a common form of kidney cancer known as renal cell carcinoma in June 2000. At the time of his death, he was only 46 years old. Walsh had a career record of 399–215–44.

Head coaching record

† Maine was forced to retroactively forfeit 13 games after the season for using an ineligible player‡ Maine was forced to retroactively forfeit 14 games during the season for using an ineligible player^ On December 22 Maine Suspended Walsh for one year for repeated NCAA rules violations* Maine voluntarily ruled itself ineligible for any postseason play in 1997

See also
List of college men's ice hockey coaches with 400 wins

References

External links 

1955 births
2001 deaths
People from White Plains, New York
Ice hockey coaches from New York (state)
Bowling Green Falcons men's ice hockey players
American ice hockey coaches
Bowling Green Falcons ice hockey coaches
Maine Black Bears men's ice hockey coaches
Michigan State Spartans ice hockey coaches
Deaths from cancer in Maine